Dolomitne is a settlement in Bakhmut Raion (district) in Donetsk Oblast of eastern Ukraine, at 54.3 km NNE from the centre of Donetsk city.

History 
Part of the settlement was taken under control of pro-Russian forces during the War in Donbass, that started in 2014.

Demographics

The settlement had 106 inhabitants in 2001; native language distribution as of the Ukrainian Census of 2001:
Ukrainian: 35.85%
Russian: 64.15%

References

Rural settlements in Donetsk Oblast